Saint-Sulpice-les-Bois is a commune in the Corrèze department in central France.

Geography
The Triouzoune has its source in the northwestern part of the commune; it flows southeast through the commune and forms part of its southeastern boundary.

History
The village was once called Taphaleschat. The name is derived from Taifals, a barbarian people (from Oltenia) settled in Gaul in the fifth century.

Population

See also
Communes of the Corrèze department

References

Communes of Corrèze
Corrèze communes articles needing translation from French Wikipedia